Shadowless Sword is a 2005 South Korean film starring Lee Seo-jin, Yoon So-yi, and Shin Hyun-joon. A martial arts epic filmed in China, the film follows the exploits of the last prince of the Balhae Kingdom, who hides his identity in a small village until he is called to battle invaders from Khitan. It was released in North America, the United Kingdom and Ireland by New Line Cinema on DVD as The Legend of the Shadowless Sword.

Plot 
The film is set after the fall of Sanggyeong, the capital of Balhae in 926. Dongdan Kingdom dispatches the Chucksaldan (a.k.a. Killer Blade Army) to find and kill the last remaining member of the Balhae royal family, exiled prince Jeong-hyun, to prevent the possible reconstruction of Balhae. Prime Minister Lim Sun-ji, on the other hand, sends a young, talented swordswoman, Yeon So-ha, to find Prince Jeong-hyun first and bring him back safely. Jeong-hyun, however, is reluctant to come and fight for the throne, still bitter about his unfair exile. The rest of the movie follows So-ha and Jeong-hyun's journey as they fight their way back to the capital, fall in love and whether or not Jeong-hyun manages to reconstruct the fallen kingdom of Balhae.

Cast and characters 
 Lee Seo-jin as Dae Jeong-hyun, the last prince of Balhae
 When Dae Soo-hyun, the last member of the royal family is killed by the Chucksaldan, the prime minister of Balhae Lim Sun-ji is reminded of one person in a full of mournful atmosphere. Dae Jeong-hyun, the last prince of Balhae who has been forgotten from people's memory since he was involved in the political strife of the royal family and condemned to exile 14 years ago. Now he is the only hope.

 Yoon So-yi as Yeon So-ha, the best warrior of Balhae
 Yeon So-ha with an image of graceful and straight figure is the best woman warrior of Palhae, who always carries a shadowless sword (Mooyounggeom) and shows excellent skill in swordsmanship. She takes up the task of bringing Daejeonghyun to the camp safely in order to make him a king of Balhae.

 Shin Hyun-joon as Gun Hwa-pyung
 Gun Hwa-pyung was the son of a Balhae general/official who was executed by Ae of Balhae, who was the last king of Balhae. Gun Hwa-pyung somehow survived the execution and defected to the rising Khitan. He and several other Balhae defectors gathered together to form the Chuk Ssal Dan. He and this organization were under the control of a governor of the Dongdan. Hwa-pyung vowed revenge on the Balhae Royal Family for destroying he and his father's family name and status. He secretly plotted to kill off all of the royal family members, betray his master, and put himself on the former Balhae throne as king of a new kingdom. This plan does not seem to work out for him, as he finds that the last prince of Balhae has some secrets of his own to share.

Extended cast 

 Lee Ki-yong as Mae Yung-ok
 Jo Won-hee as Jo Chun-soo
 Park Sung-woong
 Lee Han-sol as Dan Yang-soo
 Jeong Ho-bin
 Jin Bong-jin
 Kim Seo-hyeon
 Jo Yeon-ho
 Lee Sang-hong
 Kim Gyeong-ryong
 Park Su-yong
 Han Gang-ho
 Nam Ji-hyun as young Yeon So-ha
 Baek Shin
 Lee Jang-hyeon
 Choi Yeong-gyun
 Lee Su-yong
 Bae Sang-cheol
 Im Se-jin
 Kang Yeong-gu
 Baek Ji-yeol
 Choi Ji-woo (cameo)
 Hwang In-seong
 Kim Su-ro (cameo)
 Jeong Jun-ha (cameo)
 Park Chan-dea
 Lee Han-gal

References

External links 
 https://web.archive.org/web/20051201005855/http://balhae2005.co.kr/
 
 
 

2005 films
2005 action films
South Korean martial arts films
South Korean epic films
2000s Korean-language films
Films set in the Middle Ages
2005 martial arts films
2000s South Korean films